Mylochromis obtusus is a species of cichlid endemic to Lake Malawi where it is currently only known from sandy areas in the southern portion of the lake.  This species can reach a length of  TL.

References

Fish of Lake Malawi
Fish of Malawi
obtusus
Fish described in 1935
Taxonomy articles created by Polbot